José Juan Héctor Scarone Berreta (26 November 1898 – 4 April 1967) was a Uruguayan footballer who played as inside forward. Scarone was considered one of the best players in the world during his time,. being nicknamed El Mago ("the Magician") due to his extraordinary skills with the ball.

At club level, Scarone spent most of his career with Nacional, with which he won 21 official titles. He scored a total of 301 goals for the club in 369 appearances. Scarone holds the record of years played for Nacional, having spent 20 years with the club. He is also the 3rd. all-time Uruguayan Primera División with 163 goals, and the 2nd. all-time top scorer of Nacional (behind Atilio García) with 301 goals.

With a height of 170cm and thin legs, Scarone was rejected by Nacional at the age of 15. He returned one year later, being accepted by the club but sent to the reserve team. Nevertheless, Scarone would be promoted to the senior squad after playing only five matches in the reserve team.

Apart from Nacional, Scarone also played for Spanish side Barcelona, and Italian clubs Inter Milan and Palermo. He was the younger brother of another legend of Nacional, Carlos Scarone.

International career 
With the Uruguay national team, Scarone won the South American Championship four times: in 1917, 1923, 1924, and 1926, and the Olympic gold medal twice: in 1924 and 1928 recognized as FIFA World Cup.

At the age of 19, he scored the goal that gave Uruguay the title at the 1917 South American Championship, in the final against Argentina, his fourth international match.

Scarone finished his international career by leading Uruguay to the 1930 FIFA World Cup, and although his international career ended that same year, the 31 goals in 52 matches (actually 52, but 21 goals were in unofficial matches) he scored for his country stood until  as the national record. With his goal against Romania on 21 July 1930 Scarone was the last player born in the 19th Century to score in a World cup final tournament.

Managerial career and later life
After retiring as a player, Scarone became a football coach. He was the second manager of Millonarios since its origins, from 1947 to 1948, while the club was still an amateur team. He was manager of Nacional and Real Madrid in the 1950s. He died in 1967 in Montevideo, aged 68, after attending a match of Nacional.

International goals  
Uruguay's goal tally first

Titles
Nacional 
 Primera División (8): 1916, 1917, 1919, 1920, 1922, 1923, 1924, 1934 
 Copa Honor (2): 1916, 1917
 Copa Competencia (3): 1919, 1921, 1923
 Copa Albion (1): 1919
 Copa León Peyrou (1): 1920
 Torneo Competencia (1): 1934
 Copa de Honor Cousenier (2): 1916, 1917
 Copa Aldao (3): 1916, 1919, 1920

Barcelona
 Copa del Rey (1): 1926

Uruguay national team
 Copa América (4): 1917, 1923, 1924, 1926
 Olympic Games (2): 1924, 1928
 FIFA World Cup (1): 1930

References

External links

Scarone's international statistics at the RSSSF

!colspan="3" style="background:#C1D8FF;"| World Cup-winners status
|-

1898 births
1930 FIFA World Cup players
1967 deaths
Footballers from Montevideo
Uruguayan footballers
Uruguayan Primera División players
Club Nacional de Football players
La Liga players
FC Barcelona players
Inter Milan players
Uruguayan expatriate footballers
Expatriate footballers in Spain
Expatriate footballers in Italy
Uruguayan expatriate sportspeople in Spain
Uruguayan expatriate sportspeople in Italy
Serie A players
Uruguay international footballers
Olympic footballers of Uruguay
Footballers at the 1924 Summer Olympics
Footballers at the 1928 Summer Olympics
Medalists at the 1924 Summer Olympics
Medalists at the 1928 Summer Olympics
Olympic gold medalists for Uruguay
FIFA World Cup-winning players
La Liga managers
Club Nacional de Football managers
Real Madrid CF managers
S.D. Quito managers
Uruguayan football managers
Uruguayan expatriate football managers
Uruguayan people of Italian descent
Olympic medalists in football
Copa América-winning players
Association football inside forwards
Uruguayan expatriate sportspeople in Colombia
Expatriate football managers in Colombia
Expatriate football managers in Spain